Elfriede von Nitzsch (26 January 1920 – 29 October 2011) was a German athlete. She competed in the women's long jump at the 1952 Summer Olympics.

References

1920 births
2011 deaths
Athletes (track and field) at the 1952 Summer Olympics
German female long jumpers
Olympic athletes of Germany
Place of birth missing